The Five Tiger Generals of TVB (無綫五虎將), more commonly referred to as simply the Five Tigers (五虎), were a group of five of the most popular young leading male actors of 1980s Hong Kong television. The group consisted of Michael Miu 苗僑偉 ("Big Tiger"), Kent Tong 湯鎮業 ("Second Tiger"), Felix Wong 黃日華 ("Third Tiger"), Andy Lau 劉德華 ("Fourth Tiger"), and Tony Leung Chiu-wai 梁朝偉 ("Small Tiger"). The group was formed to collectively promote the popularity of the five members, as well as to promote the company's various drama and entertainment productions. Five Tiger Generals was a name given to them by the media. The term is a popular appellation in Chinese culture, meaning a ruler's five best military generals.

Background
While all 5 members were once trainees of TVB's then all-year Artiste Training Academy, they joined the school at different times—Kent Tong joined in 1978, Michael Miu and Felix Wong in 1979, Andy Lau in 1980, and Tony Leung in 1981. Tong was the first to debut with his first role as the supporting character Wu Wang-yuen in the 1980 drama This Land is Mine. Wong's first role was in the 1981 The Misadventure of Zoo. The other 3 members had debut roles while still trainees at the school: Miu's debut role was the 1980 drama The Adventurer's, Lau's first role was in the sitcom Hong Kong '81, and Leung had his first major role in the 1982 Soldier of Fortune, which also starred Wong and Tong.

It did not take long for the Five Tigers to become popular. According to Wong during a 2009 interview for the talk show Be My Guest, TVB's first generation of leading actors at the time, which included Adam Cheng and Chow Yun-fat, were leaving the company, and TVB was in need of rounding up a new generation of popular idols; thus, the members of the Five Tigers quickly rose to fame due to many performing opportunities. Wong said that as soon as he graduated from acting school, he was offered a major supporting role. Wong was then offered a leading role in his second drama, The Lonely Hunter (1981), which shot him to instant fame in Hong Kong.

Formation
In September 1983, amidst a ratings competition with Korean and Japanese variety shows, TVB created the show All Star Challenge, which featured almost an entire lineup of the most popular actors and singers of Hong Kong at the time. The five most popular young male idols at the station—Miu, Tong, Wong, Lau, and Leung—were grouped together to perform a variety of stage performances at the show, such as singing and dancing. Their appearances brought in a lot of media attention, and their performances were a selling point for the show. The media then branded them as TVB's Five Tiger Generals, and the term quickly caught on to the public. Since their formation, the five of them consistently made public appearances together as a group; they even expressed that they would like to release an album together under their name. In 1991, the group starred in the action thriller The Tigers, a film adaptation of the 1984 television drama Rise and Fall of a Stand-In. It is the only film to star all five members.

Legacy and reunion
The popularity of the Five Tigers led TVB to continue with similar group projects even after the members of the Five Tigers left TVB. However, none of them were that successful. Many television dramas that featured the members of the Five Tigers, notably The Legend of the Condor Heroes (1983), The Return of the Condor Heroes (1983), Police Cadet (1984), The Duke of Mount Deer (1984), and Looking Back in Anger (1989), were branded as classics by many in Asia.

On 27 June 2010, during a press conference for a training academy in Panyu, Guangzhou, Tong revealed that the five members are planning for another reunion project. The collaboration between Miu and Wong in the 2010 drama Gun Metal Grey created a heated discussion about a possible reunion of all members in the future. "The Five Tiger Generals will definitely reunite again. The five of us really hope for that day to come; in fact, we are currently planning one right now."

Collaborations

See also
5 Tigers: Michael Miu, Kent Tong, Felix Wong, Andy Lau, Tony Leung Chiu-Wai
5 Beauties: Yammie Lam, Idy Chan, Margie Tsang, Jamie Chik, Kitty Lai
5 Fresh Tigers: Louis Koo, Leo Ku, Carlo Ng, Hawick Lau, Keith Ho
5 Fresh Beauties: Gigi Fu, Jojo Cho, Wallis Pang, Eileen Yeow, Joyce Chan

References

External links
TVB.com

TVB veteran actors